Poynette High School is a secondary school in Poynette, Wisconsin. The school is part of the Poynette School District.

As of the 2017–18 school year, the student enrollment at PHS was 335.  It shares its campus with Poynette Elementary School. The school colors are orange and black and the athletic teams are known as the Pumas.  They were known as the Indians until October 1, 2009, when the new Pumas nickname and mascot were announced.

Poynette won the Wisconsin Interscholastic Athletic Association state softball titles in 1998, 2005, 2011 and 2018. (Division 3).

References

External links
 Poynette High School web page
News story announcing Poynette Pumas nickname

Public high schools in Wisconsin
Schools in Columbia County, Wisconsin